The 1931 United Kingdom general election was held on Tuesday 27 October 1931 and saw a landslide election victory for the National Government which had been formed two months previously after the collapse of the second Labour government. Collectively, the parties forming the National Government won 67% of the votes and 554 seats out of 615. The bulk of the National Government's support came from the Conservative Party, and the Conservatives won 470 seats. The Labour Party suffered its greatest defeat, losing four out of every five seats compared with the previous election, including the seat of its leader Arthur Henderson. Ivor Bulmer-Thomas said the results "were the most astonishing in the history of the British party system". It is the most recent election in which one party (the Conservatives) received an absolute majority of the votes cast (despite over 97% of the votes being cast for either a party or alliance led by a leader or recent ex-leader of the Labour Party), and the last UK general election not to take place on a Thursday. It would be the last election until 1997 in which a party won over 400 seats in the House of Commons.

Background
After battling with the Great Depression for two years, the Labour government of Ramsay MacDonald was faced with a budget crisis in August 1931. The cabinet deadlocked over its response, with several influential members, such as Arthur Henderson, unwilling to support the budget cuts (in particular a cut in the rate of unemployment benefit) which were pressed by the civil service and opposition parties. Then, Chancellor of the Exchequer Philip Snowden refused to consider deficit spending or tariffs as alternative solutions.

When the government resigned, MacDonald was encouraged by King George V to form an all-party National Government to deal with the immediate crisis.

The initial hope that the government would hold office for a few weeks, and then dissolve to return to ordinary party politics, were frustrated when the government was forced to remove the pound sterling from the gold standard; meanwhile the Labour Party expelled all those who were supporting the government.

The Conservatives began pressing for the National Government to fight an election as a combined unit, and MacDonald's supporters from the Labour Party formed a National Labour Organisation to support him; MacDonald came to endorse an early election to take advantage of Labour's unpopularity. However the Liberals were sceptical about an election and had to be persuaded. Former Liberal leader David Lloyd George firmly opposed the decision to call an election and urged his colleagues to withdraw from the National Government.

A main issue was the Conservatives' wish to introduce protectionist trade policies. This issue not only divided the government from the opposition but also divided the parties in the National Government: the majority of Liberals, led by Sir Herbert Samuel, were opposed and supported free trade, but on the eve of the election a faction known as Liberal Nationals under the leadership of Sir John Simon was formed who were willing to support protectionist trade policies.

In order to preserve the Liberals within the National Government, the government itself did not endorse a policy but appealed for a "Doctor's Mandate" to do whatever was necessary to rescue the economy. Individual Conservative candidates supported protective tariffs.

Labour campaigned on opposition to public spending cuts, but found it difficult to defend the record of the party's former government and the fact that most of the cuts had been agreed before it fell.

Historian Andrew Thorpe argues that Labour lost credibility by 1931 as unemployment soared, especially in coal, textiles, shipbuilding and steel. The working class increasingly lost confidence in the ability of Labour to solve the most pressing problem.

The 2.5 million Irish Catholics in England and Scotland were a major component in the Labour base in many industrial areas. The Catholic Church had previously tolerated the Labour Party, and denied that it represented true socialism. However, the bishops by 1930 had grown increasingly alarmed at Labour's policies towards Communist Russia, towards birth control and especially towards funding Catholic schools. They warned its members. The Catholic shift against Labour and in favour of the National Government played a major role in Labour's losses.

Parliament was dissolved on 7 October.

Outcome
The mainstream Labour vote fell sharply; the 20 seats contested by National Labour however saw 13 gains. The National Government promised came about. This was as to 470 of its 518 seats through Conservatives, 518 being a landslide or supermajority for safety, denoting no high taxation, large deficits, superinflation nor great currency devaluation but also for a government of national unity, all talents and spreading of state investments and relief measures nationwide to tackle the poverty and downturn of the Great Depression.

Most Government MPs were Conservatives under the leadership of Stanley Baldwin but MacDonald (Nat. Lab.) remained as Prime Minister in the new National Government.

The main group of Liberals lacked the funds to contest all viable seats yet won almost as many as the Labour Party. More MPs (72) were elected under a Liberal ticket (ballot description) of some type than the tally of Labour and National Labour MPs (65), but the three-way split in their party meant that the main Labour group would be the second-largest in the House of Commons.

Results

|colspan=12 bgcolor=#E0E0E0 align="center"|National Government
|-

|- 
|colspan=1 bgcolor=#000000 align="left"|
|colspan=1 bgcolor=#efefef align="left"| National Government (total)
|colspan=1 bgcolor=#efefef align="right"| Ramsay MacDonald
|colspan=1 bgcolor=#efefef align="right"| 694
|colspan=1 bgcolor=#efefef align="right"| 554
|colspan=1 bgcolor=#efefef align="right"| 
|colspan=1 bgcolor=#efefef align="right"| 
|colspan=1 bgcolor=#efefef align="right"| +236
|colspan=1 bgcolor=#efefef align="right"| 90.1
|colspan=1 bgcolor=#efefef align="right"| 67.2
|colspan=1 bgcolor=#efefef align="right"| 13,902,232
|colspan=1 bgcolor=#efefef align="right"|+5.5
|-
|colspan=12 bgcolor=#E0E0E0 align="center"|Labour Opposition
|-

|- 
|colspan=1 bgcolor=#DC241f align="left"|
|colspan=1 bgcolor=#efefef align="left"| Labour (total)
|colspan=1 bgcolor=#efefef align="right"| Arthur Henderson
|colspan=1 bgcolor=#efefef align="right"| 516
|colspan=1 bgcolor=#efefef align="right"| 52
|colspan=1 bgcolor=#efefef align="right"| 
|colspan=1 bgcolor=#efefef align="right"| 
|colspan=1 bgcolor=#efefef align="right"| −235
|colspan=1 bgcolor=#efefef align="right"| 8.5
|colspan=1 bgcolor=#efefef align="right"| 30.6
|colspan=1 bgcolor=#efefef align="right"|  6,395,065
|colspan=1 bgcolor=#efefef align="right"|−6.5
|-
|colspan=12 bgcolor=#E0E0E0 align="center"|Other opposition parties

|}

Votes summary

Seats summary

Transfers of seats
This differs from the above list in including seats where the incumbent was standing down and therefore there was no possibility of any one person being defeated. The aim is to provide a comparison with the previous election. In addition, it provides information about which party gained the seat.

 All comparisons are with the 1929 election.
In some cases the change is due to the MP defecting to the gaining party. Such circumstances are marked with a *.
In other circumstances the change is due to the seat having been won by the gaining party in a by-election in the intervening years, and then retained in 1931. Such circumstances are marked with a †.

1 Sitting MP had defected to the New Party
2 Sitting MP had defected to National Labour
3 Sitting MP had defected to Labour
4 Sitting MP had defected to Independent Labour

Results by constituency
These are available at the PoliticsResources website, a link to which is given below.

See also
List of MPs elected in the 1931 United Kingdom general election
1931 United Kingdom general election in Scotland
1931 United Kingdom general election in Northern Ireland

Footnotes

References

Further reading

External links
1931 election results by constituency
United Kingdom election results—summary results 1885–1979

Manifestos
1931 Conservative manifesto
1931 Labour manifesto
1931 Liberal manifesto

 
1931
General election
General election
United Kingdom general election
Ramsay MacDonald